Rocky Mountain Trophy Hunter is a series of hunting games developed or published by Sunstorm Interactive.

Games

See also

Deer Hunter, a deer hunting series of video games also by Sunstorm Interactive.

References

External links
Sunstorm game pages: Rocky Mountain Trophy Hunter, Alaskan Expedition, 2, 3 at Sunstorm Interactive
Rocky Mountain Trophy Hunter 3 at SCS Software

1999 video games
2000 video games
First-person shooters
Video games developed in the Czech Republic
Video games developed in the United States
Video game franchises
Game Boy Color games
Hunting video games
Classic Mac OS games
Video game franchises introduced in 1998
Windows games
Windows-only games